The Fratelli Mancuso, the brothers Enzo and Lorenzo Mancuso, are musicians who were born in Sutera in the province of Caltanissetta, Sicily. They moved to London in the 1970s and have been based in Città della Pieve, Umbria since 1981.

They sing in Sicilian, accompanying themselves of a number of acoustic instruments. Their music is in a modern, distinctly Sicilian style which incorporates a range of traditional elements.

References

External links
 Italian Music History
 eurokaz festival gives a short biography.
 Amiata Records   Short biography and discography from their record publishers.

Italian musical groups
Living people
People from Caltanissetta
Year of birth missing (living people)
Musicians from Sicily
Musical groups from Sicily